The 67th Combat Support Hospital was the only forward deployed combat support hospital in Europe with both warfighter support and community service missions. Medical readiness was the primary concern for the unit. Located in the heart of the European theater, the 67th Combat Support Hospital stood ready to provide Echelon III health care around the globe.

History 
The 67th Combat Support Hospital was originally constituted as Evacuation Hospital No 67 on 21 July 1924 in the organized reserves and was allocated the VII Corps area.

On 23 March 1925, Evacuation Hospital No. 67 was redesignated as the 67th Evacuation Hospital. Then, on 1 October 1933, the 67th Evacuation Hospital was withdrawn as an organized reserve unit and allocated to the VII Army as a regular Army Unit, inactive. The 67th Evacuation Hospital was activated on 16 March 1942 at Fort Rodman, Massachusetts, and assigned to the first Army.

The 67th Evacuation Hospital was redesignated as the 67th Evacuation, Semi-mobile in February 1943.  The unit staged for movement to the European Theater of operations, arriving in Scotland on 29 November 1943, and was reassigned to the First US Army and moved to England. From 30 November 1943 to 16 June 1944 the unit trained at several locations in Gloucestershire, England. On 17 June 1944, the 67th Evacuation Hospital, semi-mobile landed at Utah Beach, Normandy. The unit participated in the Normandy, Northern France, Rhineland, Ardennes Pass-Alsace, and Central Europe campaigns during WWII, and was decorated with the meritorious unit commendation streamer embroidered European Theater.

In December 1945, the 67th Evacuation Hospital, semi-mobile returned to the United States and was inactivated at Camp Kilmer, New Jersey on 1 January 1946. The unit was redesignated as the 67th Evacuation Hospital on 10 June 1963 and activated at Fort Carson, Colorado.

The 67th Evacuation Hospital deployed to Qui Nhon, Vietnam in October 1966, and moved to Pleiku in January 1972. The 67th Evacuation Hospital participated in 15 campaigns during the Vietnam War and was decorated with three meritorious unit commendation streamers embroidered Vietnam 1967–1968 and 1970–1972 and 1972-1973.  In March 1973, the 67th Evacuation Hospital was inactivated in Pleiku, Vietnam.

The 67th Evacuation Hospital was again activated on 21 November 1975 in Heidelberg, Germany and was assigned to augment the United States Army Medical Department Activity, Würzburg on the following day. The 67th Evacuation Hospital was officially redesignated the 67th Combat Support Hospital on 16 July 1993. The 67th Combat Support Hospital deployed to the Balkans to support operations in Hungary and Bosnia, from 12 December 1995 to 12 April 1997. It redeployed to Hungary and Bosnia from 8 April 1998 to 8 October 1998 as Task Force 67 and Task Force Med Eagle respectively in support of SFOR.

The 67th Combat Support Hospital deployed a 32-bed expandable to 52 bed Contingency Medical Force (CMF) consisting of 100+ personnel on 3 July 1999 to Camp Bondsteel, Kosovo in support of Task Force Falcon, Operation Joint Guardian II. The CMF was named Task Force MED Falcon and assumed the level III medical mission in Kosovo on 14 July 1999. The 67th CSH returned to Kosovo in 2002 for another 12-month rotation in support of Task Force Medical Falcon that ended in April 2003.

Deployed in support of Operation Iraqi Freedom (OIF) from January 2004 to January 2005 running split based operations in Mosul and Tikrit.  The Task Force (TF) 67 Headquarters and Company B operated out of Forward Operating Base (FOB) Diamondback, and Company A operating out of FOB Speicher.  TF 67 also provided the nucleus of the Medical Unit that operated as the first medical support at the Baghdad Central Detention Facility (Abu Ghraib), augmented by the 848th Forward Surgical Team (FST) and individual medical personnel augmentees from other 2nd Medical Brigade Units.  TF 67 initial fell under the command and control of the 30th Medical Brigade who had deployed from Heidelberg, Germany, in support of OIF 1.  Shortly after TF 67 assumed its deployment mission in Iraq the 30th Medical Brigade was replaced by the Army Reserve 2nd Medical Brigade.  The 2nd Medical Brigade was replaced about nine months later by the 44th Medical Brigade based out of Fort Bragg, NC.  TF 67 was replaced in Iraq by the Army Reserve's 228th Combat Support Hospital based out of Texas.

The 67th Combat Support Hospital was deactivated at Würzburg, Germany on 19 October 2007 as part of the draw down of US forces in Germany.

See also
List of former United States Army medical units

Sources
 Retreat ceremony circa 1966
 wuerzburg.healthcare.hqusareur.army.mil
 history.amedd.army.mil

Hospitals established in 1924
0067